I Would Rather Stay Poor is a 1962 thriller novel by British writer James Hadley Chase.

Plot summary
Dave Calvin, handsome and well built, with a charm that women would fall for, but divorced, dishonest and greedy, is appointed as manager of the bank in Pittsville when the existing manager falls ill. On the advice of his simple and innocent secretary Alice Craig, he soon finds lodging with widowed Kit Loring staying with her young daughter who is in love with Ken Travers, the local police deputy sheriff, waiting for a breakthrough to marry his lover.

Soon Calvin decides to steal a huge payroll of $300,000 from the bank and get away with it, and ropes in Kit for the same. But things do not go their way, and soon they find themselves in a puddle of troubles full of treachery, deception and even murder. And to make matters worse for Calvin, he soon realizes that Kit is an alcoholic who can spill the beans anytime.

References

External links 
Profile on Fantastic Fiction

1962 British novels
British thriller novels
British novels adapted into films
Robert Hale books